Loughborough University (abbreviated as Lough or Lboro for post-nominals) is a public research university in the market town of Loughborough, Leicestershire, England. It has been a university since 1966, but it dates back to 1909, when Loughborough Technical Institute began with a focus on skills directly applicable in the wider world. In March 2013, the university announced it had bought the former broadcast centre at the Queen Elizabeth Olympic Park as a second campus. The annual income of the institution for 2021–22 was £328 million of which £39.2 million was from research grants and contracts, with an expenditure of £379.4 million.

History
The university traces its roots back to 1909 when a Technical Institute was founded in the town centre. There followed a period of rapid expansion, during which it was renamed Loughborough College and development of the present campus began.

In early years, efforts were made to mimic the environment of an Oxbridge college (e.g. students wore gowns to lectures) whilst maintaining a strong practical counterbalance to academic learning. During World War I, it served as an "instructional factory", training workers for the munitions industry.

The Loughborough colleges
Following the war, the institute divided into four separate colleges:
Loughborough Training College (teacher training)
Loughborough College of Art (art and design)
Loughborough College of Further Education (technical and vocational)
Loughborough College of Technology (technology and science)

The last would become the nucleus of the present university. Its rapid expansion from a small provincial college to the first British technical university was due largely to its principals, Herbert Schofield, who led it from 1915 to 1950 and Herbert Haslegrave, who oversaw its further expansion from 1953 to 1967 and steered its progress first to a College of Advanced Technology and then a university in 1966. In 1977, the university broadened its range of studies by amalgamating with Loughborough College of Education (formerly the Training College). More recently, in August 1998, the university merged with Loughborough College of Art and Design (LCAD). Loughborough College remains a college of further education.

Influence of Herbert Schofield
Herbert Schofield became principal in 1915 and continued to lead the College of Technology until 1950. Over his years, the college changed almost beyond recognition. He bought the estate of Burleigh Hall on the western outskirts of the town, which became the nucleus of the present  campus. He oversaw the building of the original Hazlerigg and Rutland halls of residence, which are now home to the university's administration and the vice-chancellor's offices.

From college to university
An experienced educationist, Herbert Haslegrave took over as college principal in 1953. By increasing breadths and raising standards, he gained it the status of Colleges of Advanced Technology in 1958. He persuaded the Department of Education to buy further land and began a building programme.

In 1963, the Robbins Report on higher education recommended that all colleges of advanced technology be given university status. Loughborough College of Technology was granted a Royal Charter on 19 April 1966 and became Loughborough University of Technology (LUT), with Haslegrave as its first vice-chancellor. It gradually remodelled itself in the image of the plate glass universities of the period, which had also been created under Robbins.

Later history
In 1977, Loughborough Training College (now Loughborough College of Education) was absorbed into the university. The Arts College was also amalgamated with the university in 1998. These additions have diluted the technological flavour of the institution, causing it to resemble more a traditional university with its mix of humanities, arts and sciences. In 1996, the university dropped the "of Technology" from its title, becoming plain Loughborough University.

The shortened name "Lboro", "Lufbra" or "Luff" is commonly used by the students' union, the alumni association and others.

Campus

The university's main campus is in the town of Loughborough.

Of particular interest are The Walled Garden, with its Garden of Remembrance, the Hazlerigg-Rutland Hall fountain-courtyard, the old cottage, and the Bastard Gates donated by and named after William Bastard, the Chairman of College Governors, which form the official entrance to Rutland Hall.

In the central quadrangle of the campus stands a famous cedar, which has often appeared as a symbol for the university. A heavy snowfall in December 1990 led to the collapse of the upper canopy which gave the tree its distinctive shape.

Library

The Pilkington Library opened in 1980. It covers 9,161 square metres over four floors with 1375 study places – up from 780 prior to the renovation in late 2013. The library has a history of undertaking research in the field of library and information work. There is an open access area, where students are allowed to take in cold food and drinks as well as to engage in group discussions.

Burleigh Court Conference Centre and Hotel
Burleigh Court Conference Centre and Hotel is a four-star hotel and conference centre on campus that has 225 bedrooms and incorporates Burleigh Springs Leisure and Therapy Centre, a spa and leisure facility.

Holywell Park Conference Centre
Holywell Park Conference Centre is a conference and meeting venue located on campus. It was used as the kitting out location for Team GB prior to the 2012 Summer Olympics.

Elite Athlete Centre and Hotel
Elite Athlete Centre and Hotel is a training base and hotel for elite athletes opening in November 2018.

University Stadium

The £4 million stadium for the university's rugby and football first teams was opened in 2012 and has a capacity of 3,000. It is home to Loughborough University FC, which is one of the few university sides to play in the English football league system, currently competing in the United Counties League. The stadium has many features not normally found at that level of football including a digital scoreboard, conference facilities and 14 changing rooms. In 2018 it hosted four matches in the group stages of the European Under-17 Championships.

Organisation

Loughborough University is headed by a vice-chancellor and is organised into nine schools:

School of Aeronautical, Automotive, Chemical and Materials Engineering (comprising the three departments of Aeronautical and Automotive Engineering, Chemical Engineering, and Materials)
School of Architecture, Building and Civil Engineering
School of Business and Economics
School of Design and Creative Arts
Wolfson School of Mechanical, Electrical and Manufacturing Engineering
School of Science (comprising the four departments of Chemistry, Computer Science, Mathematical Sciences and Physics)
School of Social Sciences and Humanities (comprising the five divisions of Communication and Media; Criminology, Sociology and Social Policy; English; Geography and Environment; International Relations, Politics and History)
School of Sport, Exercise and Health Sciences
Loughborough University London (comprising the Institute for Design Innovation, Institute for Digital Technologies, Academy of Diplomacy and International Governance, Glendonbrook Institute for Enterprise Development, Institute for International Management, Institute for Media and Creative Industries, Institute for Sport Business)

Each of the 10 schools has a senior management team (School SMTs), consisting of deans, associate deans for teaching, research and enterprise, and operations managers. With this change of organisation within the university, the new Academic Leadership Team (ALT), made up of the vice-chancellor, deputy vice-chancellor, chief operating officer, director of finance, the pro vice-chancellors for research, teaching and enterprise, and the 10 new deans, replaced the previous Executive Leadership Team (ELT).

Politics, History and International Relations

The Department of Politics, History and International Relations (PHIR) is a department of Loughborough University located in Leicestershire. PHIR evolved from the Department of European Studies, which was established in 1972. In 2001 in the Research Assessment Exercise PHIR was awarded a grade of 5B and in the same year it scored 23/24 in the External Subject Review. It was not until 2003 that the department took the decision to invest in the study of Politics and International Relations and began to offer undergraduate degrees in International Relations.  It was after this that the department had a change of name and became the Department of Politics, International Relations and European Studies. In 2005 the department greatly expanded in size and added a further three members of staff.  It added a further three lecturers to its number in 2007.

As of 2009 PHIR now offers History as one half of a selection of joint honours degrees. As History has become a major component of the department it was renamed to reflect this fact. European Studies was dropped from the name and replaced by History, the Department of Politics, International Relations and European Studies (PIRES) becoming the Department of Politics, History and International Relations or 'PHIR'.

The department currently offers seven undergraduate courses, three Masters courses and provides research possibilities (with the department being recognised by the ESRC). PHIR is the center for the university-wide Languages Programme.  This programme offers the chance to include French, German or Spanish as part of an undergraduate degree. After hours tuition is also available as part of the Extra-curricular Language Programme. Languages provided for as of 2007 include: Arabic, Chinese, Czech, French, German, Italian, Japanese, Spanish and Russian. The Schofield Building on campus houses the Mathematics Education Centre. Here students can get support and guidance regarding mathematical skills. In particular the staff have in-depth knowledge of statistics and the statistics research-based programme SPSS.

The Department of PHIR focuses its research primarily on three main areas: Politics and Public Policy (where the university won the Queen's Anniversary Prize in 2005), International Relations, and European Studies. Within these broad areas, aspects of particular interest include the Common Foreign and Security Policy of the EU; EU-Asia relations; political thought and theory; security studies; intelligence studies; sexual politics; human rights.

PHIR has earned the respect of many for its high standards in teaching and for its tradition of good quality research.
It earned a score of 23/24 for Teaching Quality from the British Government's Quality Assurance Agency for Higher Education.
Research Assessment Exercise it scored a score of 5/5*for the quality of its research.
Students gave PIRES 82% for student satisfaction.
PIRES was declared a Jean Monnet Centre of Excellence by the European Commission.

As of 2007 there were 21 academic, 9 teaching and 6 support staff all working within the department of PHIR. Notably, Ruth Kinna is Professor of Political Theory. Notable alumni include Paula Radcliffe, Tanni Grey-Thompson and James Gibson.

Loughborough Sport
Loughborough Sport is the brand identity for the sport-related activities and facilities at the university. The university is host to a number of sports governing bodies including England cricket, British swimming, British Triathlon, England Netball, British athletics and British weight lifting

Traditions
The official colour of the university is African violet. The coat of arms incorporates several symbols relevant to the history of the Loughborough area, including Offa of Mercia's cross (a symbol of the ancient kingdom of Mercia, within whose borders the town now stands) and the peafowl from the arms of the Dukes of Rutland. The motto of the university is veritate scientia labore ("with truth, wisdom and labour", or, alternatively, "with truth, knowledge and work", depending on the translation).

The university has a strong tradition in both engineering and sport. From its strong engineering and technical background it has now expanded, becoming a centre of excellence in the field of sports and sports science. It has graduated a number of world-class athletes including Paula Radcliffe and Lord Coe. In keeping with this tradition, Loughborough students have won the British Universities & Colleges Sport Association (BUCS) championship every year for four decades. The university is the home of the England and Wales Cricket Board's National Academy, opened in November 2003.

The phonetic spelling "Lufbra" is sometimes used amongst students, graduates, and in Students' Union publications, and the name is also often abbreviated to "lboro", both casually and within more formal/academic circles, stemmed from the university's URL of "www.lboro.ac.uk".

There is a one-week break between semester one and semester two. Normally few to no exams are scheduled in this week therefore students are presented with a week free from studies. This week is referred to as Refreshers Week by most students.

The university (and Loughborough College before it) once had a "mascot" consisting of an oversized knight's helmet with a lowered visor, commonly called "Thor". This was constructed in 1958 by students of Hazlerigg-Rutland hall in the college welding shop. In the late 1980s Thor was displayed in the Students' Union foyer, but it has since gone missing. There is much speculation concerning its current whereabouts.

Academic profile
The university has 20 academic departments and over 100 research groups, institutes and centres currently divided between nine schools. Previously the departments and research institutes had been split between three faculties: Science, Engineering and Social Science & Humanities.

Its current Chancellor is Lord Sebastian Coe, (the previous chancellor, Sir Nigel Rudd retired from the position in summer 2015, having served for five years).

Loughborough University's acting vice-chancellor and president is Professor Chris Linton. Nick Jennings CB will take up the post in October 2021 following the departure of Robert Allison, who left the post at the end of the 2020/21 academic year.

The university has won seven Queen's Anniversary Prizes for Higher and Further Education for work with the aeronautical and automotive industries (1994); support for developing countries (1998); for a pioneering role in developing applications of modern optics and laser technologies (2000); for its world leading roles in sports research, education and development (2002); for its world leading role in social policy in recognition of its outstanding and widely respected work in evaluating and helping develop social policy-related programmes, such as those for cared for children, social security policy, crime prevention, education initiatives and young carers (2005); for recognition of its vehicle, road and driver safety research (2007); and for its impact through research and skills development in High Value Manufacturing to create economic growth (2013).

The university has the largest sports scholarship programme in the UK, with over 250 international athletes studying and training.

Admissions

In terms of average UCAS points of entrants, Loughborough ranked 30th in Britain in 2014. According to the 2017 Times and Sunday Times Good University Guide, approximately 17% of Loughborough's undergraduates come from independent schools. In the 2016–17 academic year, the university had a domicile breakdown of 79:5:16 of UK:EU:non-EU students respectively with a female to male ratio of 39:61.

Rankings and reputation

Loughborough was named University of the Year 2019 in The Times and Sunday Times University Good University Guide. Loughborough is one of only four universities, along with Bath, Oxford and St Andrews, to have won the title twice. Loughborough also moved up to 5th overall in the Good University Guide. Loughborough was also given the title of university of the year at the Whatuni Student Choice Awards 2018.

In the 2020 ranking exercise by Times Higher Education, Loughborough was ranked 59th in the world for the Best 'Golden Age' Universities, defined as those universities established for over 50 years, but less than 80 years.

In 2018 Loughborough was named best in the UK for student experience in the Times Higher Education Student Experience Survey for the fifth time since 2009.

Loughborough University was ranked 4th in the 2019 Guardian University League table.

Loughborough kept its position as the best university in the world to study sports-related subjects in the global 2018 QS higher education league table. In 2017 Loughborough achieved a five star plus rating in the QS Stars University Ratings.

The Centre for Renewable Energy Systems Technology, or CREST, runs the internationally recognised masters programme in renewable energy. The Department of Politics, History and International Relations, or PHIR as it is commonly known, is home to researchers in European politics and international relations. The Centre for Research in Social Policy is an independent research centre based within the Department of Social Sciences. It is responsible for calculating the Minimum Income Standard in the United Kingdom for the Joseph Rowntree Foundation.

Sports

Loughborough is renowned in the UK for its sports provisions. Loughborough is home to the world's largest university-based sports technology research group, which is part of the Sports Technology Institute. SportPark, based at the university provides a home for national sporting bodies including Youth Sport Trust, British Swimming and several other national governing bodies. Loughborough Students have performed well in the BUCS Overall Championship for more than forty years, winning the overall trophy for 40 successive years.

The ECB National Academy which is also known as the National Cricket Performance Centre has been based at Loughborough since 2003 and provides indoor and outdoor training facilities for cricketers.

Loughborough was chosen by the British Olympic Association as the training base and official Preparation Camp for Team GB in the run-up to the London 2012 Games. Students and graduates of Loughborough won four bronze medals and six Paralympic medals (one gold, three silver and two bronze) in the 2012 Summer Olympics.

At the 2014 Commonwealth Games in Glasgow, over 120 athletes from Loughborough represented 8 teams, across 10 sports. In total, 35 medals were won by athletes with Loughborough connections; 13 bronze, 13 silver and nine gold medals. If Loughborough was a country, the university would have finished 11th on the medal table at the 2014 Games.

In 2016 over 80 students, graduates and Loughborough-linked athletes travelled to Rio to participate in both the Olympic and Paralympic Games. In the Olympic competition their athletes secured 12 medals, including 5 golds. Loughborough-linked coaches also played a key role in the Games, with alumni guiding Team GB, Canada and Fiji to gold medals. During the Paralympic competition Loughborough-linked athletes secured a further 22 medals.

Student life

Students' Union

The Union building sits in the north-eastern corner of the campus, and offers a range of facilities for clubs and societies, retail, entertainment and other activities. The Union has five rooms, each with its own theme. Loughborough Students' Union (LSU), was awarded the International Experience Award 2011 by the National Union of Students (NUS).

As well as representing the student body through Union Council and offering academic support through Loughborough Students' Voice, the Union has five main sections for students: the athletic union offering 56 different sporting clubs, the Societies Federation consisting of over 80 societies, Action as the volunteering section offering a range of opportunities for students, along with 45 regular projects working with young people, the elderly, special needs, the homeless or the environment.

Loughborough Students' Rag is a student fundraising organisation. For the last eight years it has raised over £1 million per year for local, national and international charities. The total raised since records began is now over £16 million.

Loughborough has a media centre, which offers the opportunity to make TV shows with LSUTV, have your own radio show with LCR, write for the student magazine Label or improve your photography with Lens. The School of the Arts, English and Drama runs The Lamplight Press, the UK's first student-led publishing company.

Student halls
As of 2016, there are a total of 17 halls of residence, many of which are named after famous scientists and engineers. The halls are as follows:

Of these, Hazlerigg–Rutland, John Phillips, Elvyn Richards and Telford have names that were previously used for halls of residence that have since been repurposed, renamed or merged with other halls. In 2015 Loughborough University ranked first in the UK for accommodation on a university review platform StudentCrowd.

Fitness facilities
Loughborough University has two main gyms, namely Powerbase and Holywell.

The Epinal 
The Epinal was Loughborough University's first independent student newspaper. It was founded in August 2012 and was run by and for students of the university. Tab Media Limited took over ownership of The Epinal in Spring 2014.

The newspaper sought to provide factually correct and informed news, in the public interest, for the students of Loughborough University, while also offering comprehensive sports coverage and intuitive comment on issues from campus and further afield. The National Student cited the publication's aim to also bring “effective and independent scrutiny of things that many would prefer not to be scrutinised or brought into the public domain.”

The Epinal was named UK Student Publication of the Month for November 2012 by Ones to Watch, a website set up by Daily Mail journalist Rosie Taylor to showcase the country's best student media. Commenting on The Epinal, Taylor wrote: "It has gone from nothing to being a major fixture of the UK’s student press in a few short months."

Ones to Watch has frequently cited some of The Epinal'''s best articles, while national magazine Athletics Weekly picked up on the news broken by The Epinal that students had started a petition opposing UK Athletics' withdrawal from the World University Games The publication broke the news in May 2013 that Loughborough University were planning to take action against the students responsible for the 'Rate Your Shag' Facebook page, receiving citations from national newspapers such as The Metro.

Tab Media Limited took over ownership of The Epinal in Spring 2014. Tab Media Limited, which has its headquarters in London, already own newspapers at 39 universities, having launched their first publication in Cambridge back in 2009.

University leadership

Chairmen of Governors
A. A. Bumpus (1909–1925)
B. B. Barrow (1925–1934)
William Bastard  (1934–1936)
W. H. Wright (1936–1940)
Sir Robert Martin (1940–1952)
Sir Harold West (1952–1957)
Sir Edward Herbert (1957–1963)
Sir Herbert Manzoni (1963–1966)
David Collett (1966-1981)
Dr Harry French (1981-1986)
Sir B. R. Dean (1992–2015)

Chancellors
Lord Pilkington (1966–1980)
Sir Arnold Hall (1980–1989)
Sir Denis Rooke (1989–2003)
Sir John Jennings (2003–2010)
Sir Nigel Rudd (2010–2016)
Lord Sebastian Coe (2017–)

Principals
S. C. Laws (1909–1915)
Herbert Schofield (1915–1950)
Major-General W. F. Hasted (1951–1952)
H. E. Falkner, J. W. Bridgeman and C. D. Bentley (interim 'triumvirate' January–September 1952)
Wing Commander H. E. Falkner (1952–1953) (acting)
Herbert Haslegrave (1953–1966)

Vice-Chancellors
Herbert Haslegrave (1966–1967)
Elfyn J. Richards (1967–1975)
Sir Clifford Butler (1975–1985)
John G. Phillips (1986–1987)
Sir David Davies (1988–1993)
Sir David Wallace (1994–2005)
Shirley Pearce (2006–2012)
Robert Allison (2012–2021) 
Nick Jennings (2021–present)

International programmes
Loughborough University and Kazakhstan's Bolashak scholarship programme signed a cooperation agreement in 2018. The agreement enables taught master's and PhD students to study at the university's two campuses in the East Midlands and London.

Notable alumni

Derek Abbott – physicist and electronic engineer 
Marissa Anita – Indonesian actress, journalist and presenter
Adrian Bailey –  Labour Co-operative politician, Member of Parliament (MP)
Adnan al-Janabi – Iraqi politician
Charles Armstrong-Jones, Viscount Linley- grandson of Princess Margaret and great-nephew of Queen Elizabeth II
Steve Backley– javelin thrower
Daniel Bennett – Singapore footballer
Nick Knight – England international cricketer
Sam Billings – England and Chennai Super King cricket player
Sir Peter Bonfield – chief executive of ICL and BT Group
Adam Bishop – winner of the 2020 Britain's Strongest Man competition
Robbie Brightwell – athlete, European 440 yards champion 1962
Victoria Clarke, psychologist
Sebastian Coe – Olympic athlete and Chairman of the London Organising Committee for the Olympic Games
David Collier – cricket administrator and businessman, chief executive of the England and Wales Cricket Board (ECB)
John Cooper – Olympic silver medallist at 440 yards hurdles in Tokyo 1964, died in the Paris air disaster 1974
Fran Cotton – rugby footballer
Peter J. H. Scott – Professor of Radiology and Pharmacology
Robin Daniels – engineer and entrepreneur. Board advisor and technology investor
James Dasaolu – athletics sprinter
Gerald Davies – Wales and British Lion rugby union player, The Times journalist, and manager of the British and Irish Lions in South Africa 2009
John Dawes – Wales and British Lions rugby player, captaining the British Lions in South Africa 1971
Mary Earps- Football player
Ross Edgley – adventurer, ultra-marathon sea swimmer and author
Tobias Ellwood – Conservative MP
Ozak Esu – electronics engineer
Diane Farr – Numb3rs actress
Lorna Fitzsimmons – NUS President and Labour Party MP
James Gibson – swimmer
Rosalind Gill – Professor of Social and Cultural Analysis, King's College, London
Lisa Goldman – theatre director and writer
Tanni Grey-Thompson – athlete
Steve Hallam – Formula 1 engineer, head of the race team for the McLaren Mercedes Team
Emma Hatton – Actress, lead role in Wicked 2016
Liam Hennessy – exercise physiologist, strength and conditioning coach, and former international athlete
Maddie Hinch – field hockey player
Johnnie Johnson – Spitfire ace of World War II, when it was Loughborough College
Ben Kay – England rugby union World Cup 2003 winner
Donna Kellogg – badminton player
Andy Kent – PDC Darts Player 
Jeanette Kwakye – athlete
Lee Tong-soung - United Koreans in Japan official football team player
Will Lenney – YouTuber
Steve Ley – chemist
Lisa Lynch – journalist
Rahul Mandal – research engineer and The Great British Bake Off winner
John Mantle – Wales rugby union and Great Britain rugby league player
Steve Matchett – former F1 mechanic, author and TV presenter
Murray McArthur – Game of Thrones and Doctor Who actor
Colin McFadyean – England and British Lions rugby union player
Colin McFarlane – The Dark Knight (film) actor
Laurent Mekies – sporting director at Scuderia Ferrari
David Moorcroft – runner
Neil Oatley  – design and development director in Formula 1 teams
Christopher O'Donnell - Olympic track and field athlete
Nicholas Osipczak – professional mixed martial artist; a cast member of SpikeTV's The Ultimate Fighter: United States vs. United Kingdom
Monty Panesar – England Test cricketer
Paula Radcliffe – athlete
Chris Read – England Cricket wicketkeeper
Mark Richardson – 400 m athlete
Bridget Riley – artist
Andy Robinson – rugby player / coach
Lisa Rogers – television presenter
Lawrie Sanchez – football manager
Malcolm Sayer – Jaguar Cars designer and engineer
Peter Scott – chemist
Robbie Simpson – Huddersfield Town FC footballer in League One
Rob Smedley – director of data systems at Formula 1 
Steve Speirs – Stella (UK TV series) actor – studied drama under birth name Steven Roberts
Brian Stubbs – footballer
Jodie Swallow – triathlete
Michael Swift – professional rugby union player and record-holder for appearances in Pro12
John Taylor – Wales rugby union player, who refused to tour with British Lions in apartheid South Africa
Zack Test – rugby union player
Paul Thomas AM – founding Vice-Chancellor of University of the Sunshine Coast
Hugo Turner and Ross Turner (The Turner Twins) – adventurers
Andrew Wilson – chief information officer, Accenture 
Bob Wilson – Arsenal goalkeeper
Sir Clive Woodward – England rugby union coach
Roger Wrightson - cricket player.

See also
Armorial of UK universities
College of advanced technology (United Kingdom)
List of universities in the UK

References
Explanatory notes

Citations

Further reading
L. M. Cantor & G. F. Matthews (1977). Loughborough from College to University: A History of Higher Education at Loughborough, 1909–66. .
Leonard Cantor (1990). Loughborough University of Technology: Past and Present''. .

External links

Loughborough University – official website
Loughborough University in London – London campus official website
BBC Leicester – Loughborough University: Educating for 100 years

Loughborough University
1909 establishments in England
Educational institutions established in 1909
Universities UK